In diplomatic history, a colour book is an officially sanctioned collection of diplomatic correspondence and other documents published by a government for educational or political reasons, or to promote the government position on current or past events. The earliest were the British Blue Books, dating to the 17th century. In World War I, all the major powers had their own color book, such as the German White Book, the Austrian Red Book, Russian Orange Book, and more.

Especially in wartime or times of crisis, colour books have been used as a form of white propaganda to justify governmental action, or to assign blame to foreign actors.  The choice of what documents to include, how to present them, and even what order to list them, can make the book tantamount to government-issued propaganda.

Terminology 

The terms for individual color books such as the British blue book go back centuries and other individual color books were common in the 19th century and especially during World War I. The collective term color book appears less frequently, and later. In German, "Rainbow book"("") is seen in 1915, and "color book" ("") in 1928. Attestations of color book in English go back to at least 1940 and the term was still new enough in 1951 to be enclosed in quotation marks.

History

Origin and early history 

In the early 17th century, blue books first came into use in England as a means of publishing diplomatic correspondence and reports. They were so named, because of their blue cover. The Oxford English Dictionary first records such a usage in 1633.

During the time of the Napoleonic Wars in the early 19th century, they were being published regularly. By the second half of the century, Turkey began publishing its own version in red, and the concept of color books spread to other countries in Europe, with each country using one color: Germany using white; France: yellow; red: Austria-Hungary (Spain also used red later, as did the Soviet Union); and Belgium: gray. Green: Italy; orange: Netherlands (and Tsarist Russia). This concept spread to the Americas as well, with the United States using red, Mexico: orange, and various countries in Central and South America using other colors; it even spread as far as China (yellow) and Japan (gray).

Nineteenth century 

The 19th century was a period of great development and activity for Blue Books which were published in large numbers in Great Britain under numerous foreign secretaries. In theory, their purpose was to give Parliament the info it needed (and sometimes demanded) to provide a basis for judgment on foreign affairs.

Causation and production 

Pressure was sometimes brought to bear, and papers might be published, which otherwise might not have been. Blue Books were bound and published since the days of Foreign Secretary George Canning. Bound Blue Book sets of the House of Commons are readily available; Lords less so.

Documents were often printed on large sheets of white paper, loosely bound, called White Papers, and were presented to the House of Commons or Lords, often unbound and undated.  This lack of date would sometimes become problematic later for historians attempting to follow the historical record, and depended on further research to sort it out. Some of the documents were reprinted and bound and known as "Blue Books" after the color of the covers. (See boxed quotation below).

Influence of Foreign Secretaries 

No other European state rivaled Great Britain in the number of Blue Book publications. Originally conceived of as a way to "meet the ebb and flow of public opinion", they were handled differently during different parts of the 19th century, under the influence of different Foreign Secretaries. Blue Books are more complete from some parts of the century than others, but a lot was always omitted, and texts were abridged. These were sometimes flagged in the text by the word 'Extract', but that didn't give any sense of scale or what was cut.

George Canning's tenure (1807–1809) stood out, as having designed a new system.
Canning used it to get public support for his positions, for example, regarding South America. Robert Stewart (Lord Castelreagh (1812-1822)) was the pivot point between the early years when the government might refuse to publish certain papers, and the later period when it wasn't able to do that anymore. Henry Templeton (Lord Palmerston three incumbencies in the 1830s and 1840s) was unable to refuse the demands of the House of Commons, as Canning had done. Later, when he rose to Prime Minister, Palmerston embodied the "Golden Age" of Blue Books, publishing a large number of them, especially during the Russell Foreign Ministry incumbency (1859-1865). Foreign Secretaries under P.M. William Gladstone (three incumbencies between 1868 and 1886) also issued many Blue Books, but were more restrained; a large number were issued about the Eastern Question.

Reaction abroad 

Publication meant that not only parliament and the public got to see them, but foreign powers got to see them as well.  Sometimes a government might be embarrassed by leaks from foreign sources, or publications from them; but they gave back as good as they got. By 1880 there were some informal rules, and foreign countries were consulted before publishing things that affected them. This prevented them from being used as instruments of policy, as under Canning or Palmerston.

Run-up to World War I 

After 1885 the situation altered again, there was less pressure from Parliament, fewer party-based papers, and almost all publications were ordered by the Crown. Towards the close of the century and beginning of the next, at some point there was less disclosure of documents, and less pressure from MPs and the public, and ministers became more restrained and secretive, for example with Sir Edward Grey, in the run-up to World War I. Penson & Temperley said, "As Parliament became more democratic its control over foreign policy declined, and, while Blue Books on domestic affairs expanded and multiplied at the end of the nineteenth century, those on foreign affairs lessened both in number and in interest." There were still numerous publications, but less diplomatic correspondence, and lots of treaty texts.

World War I

Background 

The assassination of Archduke Franz Ferdinand in Sarejevo on 28 June 1914, led to a month of diplomatic maneuvering between Austria-Hungary, Germany, Russia, France and Britain, called the July Crisis.  Austria-Hungary correctly believed that Serbian officials were involved in the assassination and on 23 July sent Serbia an ultimatum to Serbia intended to provoke a war. This led to Austria partially mobilizing, followed by Russia doing the same in support of Serbia. Austria declared war on Serbia on 28 July, and a series of partial mobilizations and diplomatic warnings followed, including Germany demanding Russia's demobilization, and warning France to remain neutral rather than come to Russia's aid. After various messages back and forth, misunderstandings, and erroneous assumptions about what other countries might do, Germany invaded Luxembourg and Belgium on 3–4 August, and Britain entered the war due to its 1839 treaty with Belgium. Europe was plunged into the Great War.

Media battle begins 

As their armies began to clash, the opposing governments engaged in a media battle attempting to avoid blame for causing the war, and casting blame on other countries, through the publication of carefully selected documents, basically consisting of diplomatic exchanges.

The German White Book appeared on 4 August 1914, and was the first such book to come out. It contains 36 documents. Within a week, most other combatant countries had published their own book, each named with a different color name.  France held off until 1 December 1914, when they finally published their Yellow Book.
Other combatants in the war published similar books: the Blue Book of Britain, the Orange Book of Russia, the Yellow Book of France, and the Austro-Hungarian Red Book, the Belgian Grey Book, and the Serbian Blue Book.

Propaganda aspects 

World War I color books attempted to cast the issuing country in a good light, and enemy countries in a poor light via numerous means including omission, selective inclusion, changes in the sequence of (undated) documents presented in order to imply certain documents appeared earlier or later than they actually did, or outright falsification.

A mistake in the compilation of the 1914 British Blue Book went unattended, and left the book vulnerable to attack by German propagandists. This unrectified mistake then led to certain details falsification in the French Yellow Book, which had copied them verbatim from the Blue Book.

German propagandists called the Yellow Book a vast "collection of falsifications". France was accused of having given its unconditional support to Russia. Germany tried to show that it was forced into general mobilization by that of Russia, which in turn, blamed Austria-Hungary. The Allied documents on the circumstances of the declaration of war, as well as the war crimes committed by the German army, constituted the basis on which the Allies would rely in 1919 to formulate Article 231 of the Treaty of Versailles assigning the exclusive responsibility for the outbreak of the war to Germany and Austria-Hungary.

A report to parliament by German jurist Hermann Kantorowicz after the war investigating the causes of World War I found that Germany had a large share of responsibility in triggering World War I, and cited the White Book as one example, in which about 75 percent of the documents presented in it were falsified.

Translations and republications 

Translation of the color books into English was often performed or approved by the governments of origin; for example, the English translation of the Italian Green Book was approved by the Royal Italian Embassy.

The New York Times undertook the republication of the full text of numerous color books in English translation, including the Green Book, which was translated for the newspaper. In addition, the Times published the British Blue Book, the German White Book, the Russian Orange Book, the Gray Book of Belgium, the Yellow Book of France, and the Red Book of Austria-Hungary.

Color books

British Blue Book 

The British Blue Book has the oldest history, going back at least as far as 1633. In the early 17th century, blue books first came into use in England as a means of publishing diplomatic correspondence and reports. They were so named due to their blue cover. They were widely used in England in the 19th century.

In World War I, the British Blue Book was the second collection of national diplomatic documents about the war to appear; it came out just days after the German White Book. It contained 159 items and was submitted to Parliament before the session of 6 August 1914, after the British declaration of war on Germany. It appeared later in an expanded, and somewhat different version, and included an introduction and reports from parliamentary sessions in the beginning of August under the title, Great Britain and the European Crisis. This version contained the same 159 items from the first one, plus two more from the British embassies in Vienna and Berlin, after the outbreak of the war.  Although incomplete (e.g., files on the English promises of aid to France, and on German concessions and proposals are not included), it is the richest of the color books and "despite its gaps, constitutes a true treasure trove of historical insights into the great crisis".

German White Book 

The German White Book was a publication by the German government of 1914 documenting their claims for the causes of World War I. The British institution of political blue books with official publications of diplomatic documents found its way to Germany relatively late. There was a lively debate about whether it was appropriate and necessary long before the first German one appeared, and also afterward among the German public, and especially in the state parliaments.

The full title was "The German White Book about the outbreak of the German-Russian-French war". An authorized English translation appeared in 1914.

The book contained extracts of diplomatic material intended to attribute the war's cause to other sources. There were many fewer dispatches in the White Book than in the British Blue Book, and those that were included were mostly to illustrate a point in the narrative of the White Book.

Russian Orange Book 

The Russian Orange Book came out in mid-August. On 20 September 1914, the NY Times published excerpts. The article said that examination of the Russian Orange Book in conjunction with reports in the British Blue Book conclusively establish responsibility on Germany and Austria for the war.

Serbian Blue Book 

Study of the Serbian role in the war was slowed by delays in publication of the Serbian Blue Book. Some began to become available in the mid-1970s.

Belgian Gray Books 

The two Belgian Gray Books came out after the Russian Orange Book and Serbian Blue Book. The second was issued in 1915.

French Yellow Book 

The French Yellow Book, completed after three months of work, contained 164 documents and came out on 1 December 1914.  Unlike the others which were limited to the weeks before the start of the war, the Yellow Book included some documents from 1913,  by shedding light on their mobilization for a European war.  Some of the documents in the Yellow Book were challenged by Germany as not genuine, but their objections were mostly ignored, and the Yellow Book was widely cited as a resource in the July crisis of 1914.

It turned out after the war was over, that the Yellow Book wasn't complete, or entirely accurate. Historians who gained access to previously unpublished French material were able to use it in their report to the Senate entitled "Origins and responsibilities for the Great War" as did ex-President Raymond Poincaré. The conclusion set forth in the report of the 1919 French Peace Commission is illustrative of the two-pronged goals of blaming their opponents while justifying their own actions, as laid out in two sentences:

Later, publication of complete archives from the period of the July crisis by Germany, Britain, and Austria, as well as some from Soviet archives, revealed some truths that the Yellow Book conveniently left out. In particular, was Yellow Book document #118, which showed a Russian mobilization in response to Austrian mobilization the day before on 30 July, but in fact, the order of mobilization was reversed; Russian mobilized first.  After a contorted explanation by Quai d'Orsay, confidence in the Yellow Book was ruined, and historians avoided using it.

She concluded,

In the German White Book, anything that could benefit the Russian position was redacted.

Austrian Red Book 

The Austrian Red Book (or Austro-Hungarian Red Book) goes back at least to the 19th century. An 1868 version was printed in London, and included cables and other diplomatic correspondence during the reign of Emperor Franz Josef, and covering such topics as the Treaty of Prague, the Luxembourg Crisis, the Treaty of London (1867), the Treaty of Vienna between Austria, France, and Italy in October 1866, five-power relations between Austria and France, England, Prussia, and Russia, as well as relations with the east (Greece, Serbia, Ottoman Empire).

Last among the great powers, Austria-Hungary published its files on the outbreak of the war in February 1915 in the Austro-Hungarian Red Book, entitled: "K. and k. Ministry of Foreign Diplomatic Affairs on the Historical Background of the 1914 War". Simultaneously, the Austro-Hungarian government published a compact popular edition of the Red Book, which included an  introduction, and translations into German of the few documents written in English or French. The Red Book contained 69 items and covered the period 29 June to 24 August 1914.

It is not clear why the Austro-Hungarian government let over six months of war elapse before it followed the example of the other powers. This was unlike the case of the delayed French Yellow Book, whose later publication meant that the French public had no files for judging the diplomatic events before the war. For Austria-Hungary, the war was primarily an Austrian-Serbian war, and there was never any lack of documents about it from the outset.

Others 

Other color books were used in other countries, including:
 ChinaYellow Book
 FinlandWhite Book
 ItalyGreen Book
 JapanGray Book
 MexicanOrange Book
 NetherlandsOrange Book
 Russian EmpireOrange Book
 SovietRed Book
 SpainRed Book
 United StatesRed Book

Contemporary descriptions

World War I 

Edmund von Mach's 1916 "Official Diplomatic Documents Relating to the Outbreak of the European War" gives the following introduction to the color books of World War I:

See also 

 British propaganda during World War I
 Causes of World War I
 Centre for the Study of the Causes of the War
 German entry into World War I
 History of propaganda
 History of the United Kingdom during World War I
 Home front during World War I
 Italian propaganda during World War I
 Opposition to World War I
 Propaganda in World War I

Works cited 

 

 
 

 
 

 

 
  
  

 
 Horne, John, and Alan Kramer. German atrocities, 1914: a history of denial (Yale University Press, 2001).
  

 
 
 
 
  

  
 
 
 
 
 

 
 
  
  
  
 
   Electronic copy from HathiTrust.

References 
Notes

Citations

Further reading

External links 

Austria-Hungary–Serbia relations
Causes of wars
Causes of World War I
Diplomatic correspondence
Government reports
Napoleonic Wars
Politics of World War I
Propaganda books and pamphlets
Propaganda
Serbia in World War I
Serbian books
Weimar Republic
World War I books
World War I documents